Racopilum cuspidigerum is a moss with a widespread distribution. It is found in Australia, New Zealand, Papua New Guinea, Philippines, Malesia and Oceania.

It also has a variety, Racopilum cuspidigerum var. convolutaceum  It is widespread in New Zealand and found in forests on rotting wood, bark, soil and rock.

References

Flora of Malesia
Flora of Australia
Flora of New Zealand
Flora of Papua New Guinea
Flora of Oceania
Flora of the Philippines
Plants described in 1872
Dicranales